Pozoa is a genus of flowering plants belonging to the family Apiaceae.

It is native to Argentina and Chile in southern South America.

The genus name of Pozoa is in honour of José Pozo (fl. 1800), a Spanish botanist at a botanical garden in Madrid. 
It was first described and published in Gen. Sp. Pl. on page 13 in 1816.

Known species
According to Kew:
Pozoa coriacea 
Pozoa volcanica

References

Azorelloideae
Apiaceae genera
Plants described in 1816
Flora of Northwest Argentina
Flora of South Argentina
Flora of central Chile
Flora of southern Chile